Izzie's Way Home is a 2016 American computer-animated fantasy adventure film produced by The Asylum. It is The Asylum's first animated feature, and is   a mockbuster of the 2016 Pixar Animation Studios film Finding Dory.

Plot
Izzie is a fish who lives with her father Harold in an aquarium, and is frequently bullied by the other fish in the vicinity. Harold tries to protect Izzie from being returned to the ocean by the human who maintains the aquarium, as that very event is what separated them from Izzie's mother. Izzie and Harold do end up being returned to the sea, and are separated during the eruption of an underwater volcano. A boat holding the aquarium tips over, causing the other fish to spill into the waters. Izzie befriends the other fish as she and her father search for one another.

Cast
 Bonnie Dennison as Izzie, a young female purple queen anthias
 Tom Virtue as Harold, Izzie's father, and Jimmy, an octopus
 Tori Spelling as April, a canary rockfish
 Zack Ward as Thurston, a silver moonfish with a British accent
 Joey Fatone as Carl, the sea cucumber
 Dawn Richard as Ginger, Carmel and Marcie, a trio of goldfish
 Lynne Marie Stewart as Clara, Izzie's mother, and Beatrice, a goblin shark
 Camille Licate as June, a pot-bellied seahorse and Mona, an elderly green moray
 Paul M. Walker as Seymour, a blobfish
 Kim Little as Kristin, a sunset anthias

Reception

Dove found the movie to be appropriate for all ages. CG Animated Review considered "while the film wasn't great, it was better than expected, and a good effort for the Asylum's first animated film".

References

External links
 
 

2016 computer-animated films
The Asylum films
American computer-animated films
Films about cephalopods
Animated films about fish
Mockbuster films
2010s English-language films
2010s American films